Mobile DNA is a peer-reviewed online-only open access scientific journal covering genomics, with a specific focus on transposable elements in DNA. It was established in 2010 and is published by BioMed Central. The editors-in-chief are Marlene Belfort (University at Albany), Cédric Feschotte (Cornell University), Haig Kazazian (Johns Hopkins University School of Medicine), and
Henry Levin (National Institutes of Health). According to the Journal Citation Reports, the journal has a 2017 impact factor of 5.891.

References

External links

Genomics journals
Online-only journals
Publications established in 2010
English-language journals